Andy Murray was the defending champion, but chose not to participate that year. Robin Söderling won the final, leading 6–4, 2–0, after Mikhail Youzhny was forced to retire because of a right hamstring injury.

Seeds

Draw

Finals

Top half

Bottom half

Qualifying

Seeds

Qualifiers

Lucky loser

Qualifying draw

First qualifier

Second qualifier

Third qualifier

Fourth qualifier

External links
Main draw
Qualifying draw

2010 ABN AMRO World Tennis Tournament
ABN AMRO World Tennis Tournament - Singles